This is a list of Croatian television related events from 2001.

Events
4 March - Vanna is selected to represent Croatia at the 2001 Eurovision Song Contest with her song "Strune ljubavi". She is selected to be the ninth Croatian Eurovision entry during Dora held at the HRT Studios in Zagreb.

Debuts

Television shows

Ending this year

Births

Deaths